KK MZT Skopje UNI Banka is a basketball club based in Skopje, Macedonia. It is the second team of Macedonian champion MZT Skopje and competes in Macedonian Second League.

History
On August 19, 2019, has been officially announced that the second team of MZT Skopje would participate in the 2019/20 basketball season. On October 10, 2019, it was announced that in the new 2019/20 season the team will participate with new name, KK MZT Skopje UNI Banka. In October 2019, MZT Skopje 2 officially played the first game in the First Macedonian League.

Players

Depth chart

References

External links
Official Website
Team info at MKF
Team info at EuroBasket

Basketball teams in North Macedonia